The Igorot cordillera mountain skink (Parvoscincus igorotorum)  is a species of skink found in the Philippines.

References

Parvoscincus
Reptiles described in 2010
Taxa named by Rafe M. Brown
Taxa named by Charles W. Linkem
Taxa named by Arvin Cantor Diesmos
Taxa named by Danilo S. Balete
Taxa named by Melizar V. Duya
Taxa named by John W. Ferner